Quatermass is the surname of the title character of a British science fiction franchise of several television serials and films, and a radio production.  Other notable uses of the word were inspired by this franchise.

Quatermass may also refer to:

Quatermass franchise
Professor Bernard Quatermass is a fictional scientist created by the writer Nigel Kneale, who appeared in several British dramatized productions:

Television serials
 The Quatermass Experiment, a 1953 British six-part television serial that aired on BBC Television
 Quatermass II, a 1955 British six-part television serial that aired on BBC Television, and which serves as a sequel to the 1953 series
 Quatermass and the Pit, a 1958–1959 British six-part television serial that aired on BBC Television, and which served as the third and final installment of the original series
 Quatermass (TV serial), a 1979 British four-part TV series that aired on ITV, and was also distributed internationally as a film titled The Quatermass Conclusion or Quatermass IV
 The Quatermass Experiment (film), a 2005 British live-broadcast television film remake of the original 1953 serial that aired on BBC Four

Films
 The Quatermass Xperiment (Hammer Film Productions, 1955), released in the United States as The Creeping Unknown or Shock!!
 Quatermass 2 (Hammer Film Productions, 1957), released in the United States as The Enemy from Space
 Quatermass and the Pit (film) (Hammer Film Productions, 1967), released in the United States as Five Million Years to Earth

Radio
 The Quatermass Memoirs (BBC Radio 3, 1996), a British radio drama-documentary

Other uses
 Quatermass (band), a British band
 Quatermass (album), their self-titled album
 Martin Quatermass, a pseudonym used by film director John Carpenter as writer of the screenplay for the film Prince of Darkness